Tomasz Piszcz (born 8 June 1977) is a former speedway rider from Poland.

Speedway career
He rode in the top tier of British Speedway riding for the Poole Pirates during the 2009 Elite League speedway season. He began his British career riding for Peterborough Panthers in 2004.

References 

1977 births
Living people
Polish speedway riders
Oxford Cheetahs riders
Peterborough Panthers riders
Poole Pirates riders